Sarcocaulon is a genus of flowering plants belonging to the family Geraniaceae.

Its native range is Angola to Southern Africa.

Species
Species:

Sarcocaulon camdeboense 
Sarcocaulon ciliatum 
Sarcocaulon flavescens 
Sarcocaulon herrei 
Sarcocaulon inerme 
Sarcocaulon lheritieri 
Sarcocaulon marlothii 
Sarcocaulon mossamedense 
Sarcocaulon multifidum 
Sarcocaulon patersonii 
Sarcocaulon peniculinum 
Sarcocaulon salmoniflorum 
Sarcocaulon spinosum 
Sarcocaulon vanderietiae

References

Geraniaceae
Geraniales genera